J. G. Prince is an Indian politician and incumbent member of the Tamil Nadu Legislative Assembly from the Colachel constituency. He represents the Indian National Congress party. He is one of the pillars of the Kanyakumari district congress. Has been serving the party since the age of 17 without changing loyalty and made the Colachel constituency a stronghold for the party. He won the 2011 and 2016 elections in Colachel constituency and 2016 he was appointed as Deputy Leader CLP, Tamil Nadu Assembly Member, AICC. As on 2021, he has 73 criminal cases pending against him.

Early life 
J. G. Prince was born on 17 May 1958 in Sama Villai, Tamil Nadu, to J. Gnana Silkhamony and V. Gnana Flora Bamy. He has completed a Bachelor of Law,(B.L), Bangalore University, and Master of Arts,(M.A), Annamalai University.

Positions Held in the Party 

 General Secretary, District Student Congress [1975-1980] 
 General Secretary, Youth Congress [1980-1983]  
 District Congress Committee [1984- Secretary] 
 General  Secretary, District Congress Committee [1985-1989]  
 Vice President, District Congress Committee [1990-1999]  
 PCC Member [1999-2000]  
 President, District Congress Committee (West) [2002-2014]
 Served as observer in Guntur Parliamentary Constituency by election in 2012 
 Served as observer in by election Trivandram Parliamentary Constituency in 2006

Achievements as a DCC President 

 Enrolled l Lakh new members to the party.
 Purchased 23 ¾ cents land for constructing the party office.
 Enrolled 25,000 labours in the Trade Union.
 Enlarged party base in Kanyakumari District by various social programs.
 The largest party in Kanyakumari District as evidence it won all the 3 contested Assembly Constituencies with the remarkable margin of votes.

Achievements as an MLA 

 Attended all of the Assembly Sessions.
 More questions raised in the Assembly in all sessions.
 Many developments projects implemented as result of representation in the Assembly especially initiative for Colachal Port.
 Post Tsunami construction of houses for the victims.
 Helped over 3000 students to get loan for higher educations.
 Helped to get affected workers in foreign countries.
 Brought many industries by private and public sector to get jobs.
 Helped thousands of widows, old aged and handicapped to get social support for living.
 Helped to form many self-helped groups especially for women.

References 

People from Kanyakumari district
Indian National Congress politicians from Tamil Nadu
Living people
Place of birth missing (living people)
1958 births
Tamil Nadu MLAs 2021–2026
Tamil Nadu MLAs 2016–2021